The Grande Prairie Wind Farm is a 400 megawatt (MW) wind farm spanning northeastern Holt County in the U.S. state of Nebraska. It increased wind generating capacity in the state by 50% to become the largest such facility upon its completion in late 2016.  It is owned and operated by Berkshire Hathaway Energy and the power is being sold to the Omaha Public Power District (OPPD) under a 20-year power purchase agreement (PPA).

Details

The facility spans about 45,000 acres of farm and grazing land in the north central region of the state near the city of O'Neill.  It includes 200 Vestas V110-2.0 MW wind turbines for which most components were manufactured in Colorado. Many turbines are located in the corners of the irrigated crop circles to minimize the impact to agricultural production.  The annual lease payments to the participating landowners total more than $2 million,  and about 25 people are employed in ongoing operations and maintenance activities.

Mortenson Construction built the facility from August 2015 to December 2016,  employing about 350 workers.   In addition to erection of the turbines, new infrastructure included access roadways, turbine foundations, electrical collection and transmission lines, and two high-voltage substations.  

The project was initiated in 2008 by Midwest Wind Energy Development Group, eventually completing much of the planning and approval work.  Developer Geronimo Energy purchased the project in 2013,  and secured the initial PPA with OPPD.  BHE Renewables then purchased the project in early 2015, and announced that it would finance construction.  Allianz Global Investors announced it was taking a $400 million interest in the project at the time of its completion.

Electricity production data from the U.S. Energy Information Administration shows that the facility operated at an average 43.5% capacity factor during its first two years of operation.

Electricity production

See also

Wind power in Nebraska
List of wind farms in the United States

References

External links
VIDEO: Grande Prairie Wind Project – BHE Renewables

Energy infrastructure completed in 2016
Wind farms in Nebraska
Buildings and structures in Holt County, Nebraska